Thambiah is a Tamil male given name. Due to the Tamil tradition of using patronymic surnames it may also be a surname for males and females.

Notable people

Given name
 Stanley Jeyaraja Tambiah (1929–2014), Ceylonese social anthropologist

Surname
 Alfred Thambiayah (born 1903), Ceylonese businessman and politician
 H. D. Thambiah (1926–1992), Ceylonese lawyer and judge
 H. W. Thambiah (1906–1997), Ceylonese academic, diplomat, lawyer and judge
 Leaena Tambyah (born 1937), Singaporean special education advocate
 R. R. Crossette-Thambiah, Ceylonese lawyer
 Thambiah Ahambaram (1913–1962), Ceylonese politician
 Tambyah Murugaser (1924–1994), Sri Lankan sportsman and sports administrator
 Thambiah Nadaraja (1917–2004), Sri Lankan lawyer and academic
 Thambiah Pathmanathan (born 1956), Singaporean footballer
 Thambaiyah Mudaliyar Sabaratnam (1895–1966), Ceylonese lawyer and politician
 Winslow Thambiah Ivers Alagaratnam (1895–1977), Ceylonese civil engineer

See also
 
 
 
 
 

Tamil masculine given names